A ventricular assist device (VAD) is an electromechanical device for assisting cardiac circulation, which is used either to partially or to completely replace the function of a failing heart. The function of a VAD differs from that of an artificial cardiac pacemaker in that a VAD pumps blood, whereas a pacemaker delivers electrical impulses to the heart muscle. Some VADs are for short-term use, typically for patients recovering from myocardial infarction (heart attack) and for patients recovering from cardiac surgery; some are for long-term use (months to years to perpetuity), typically for patients with advanced heart failure.

VADs are designed to assist either the right ventricle (RVAD) or the left ventricle (LVAD), or to assist both ventricles (BiVAD). The type of VAD implanted depends on the type of underlying heart disease, and on the pulmonary arterial resistance, which determines the workload of the right ventricle. The left ventricular assist device (LVAD) is the most common device applied to a defective heart (it is sufficient in most cases; the right side of the heart is then often able to make use of the heavily increased blood flow), but when the pulmonary arterial resistance is high, then an (additional) right ventricular assist device (RVAD) might be necessary to resolve the problem of cardiac circulation. If both an LVAD and an RVAD are needed a BiVAD is normally used, rather than a separate LVAD and RVAD.

Normally, the long-term VAD is used as a bridge to transplantation (BTT) – keeping the patient alive, and in reasonably good condition, and able to await heart transplant outside of the hospital. Other "bridges" include bridge to candidacy, bridge to decision, and bridge to recovery. In some instances VADs are also used as destination therapy (DT). In this instance, the patient will not undergo a heart transplant and will rely on the VAD for the remainder of his or her life.

VADs are distinct from artificial hearts, which are designed to assume cardiac function, and generally require the removal of the patient's heart.

Design

Pumps

The pumps used in VADs can be divided into two main categories – pulsatile pumps, which mimic the natural pulsing action of the heart, and continuous-flow pumps. Pulsatile VADs use positive displacement pumps. In some pulsatile pumps (that use compressed air as an energy source), the volume occupied by blood varies during the pumping cycle. If the pump is contained inside the body then a vent tube to the outside air is required.

Continuous-flow VADs are smaller and have proven to be more durable than pulsatile VADs. They normally use either a centrifugal pump or an axial flow pump. Both types have a central rotor containing permanent magnets. Controlled electric currents running through coils contained in the pump housing apply forces to the magnets, which in turn cause the rotors to spin. In the centrifugal pumps, the rotors are shaped to accelerate the blood circumferentially and thereby cause it to move toward the outer rim of the pump, whereas in the axial flow pumps the rotors are more or less cylindrical with blades that are helical, causing the blood to be accelerated in the direction of the rotor's axis.

An important issue with continuous flow pumps is the method used to suspend the rotor. Early versions used solid bearings; however, newer pumps, some of which are approved for use in the EU, use either magnetic levitation ("maglev") or hydrodynamic suspension. These pumps contain only one moving part (the rotor).

History

The first left ventricular assist device (LVAD) system was created by Domingo Liotta at Baylor College of Medicine in Houston in 1962. The first LVAD was implanted in 1963 by Liotta and E. Stanley Crawford. The first successful implantation of an LVAD was completed in 1966 by Liotta along with Dr. Michael E. DeBakey. The patient was a 37-year-old woman, and a paracorporeal (external) circuit was able to provide mechanical support for 10 days after the surgery. The first successful long-term implantation of an LVAD was conducted in 1988 by Dr. William F. Bernhard of Boston Children's Hospital Medical Center and Thermedics, Inc. of Woburn, MA, under a National Institutes of Health (NIH) research contract which developed HeartMate, an electronically controlled assist device. This was funded by a three-year $6.2 million contract to Thermedics and Children's Hospital, Boston, MA, from the National Heart, Lung, and Blood Institute, a program of the NIH. The early VADs emulated the heart by using a "pulsatile" action where blood is alternately sucked into the pump from the left ventricle then forced out into the aorta. Devices of this kind include the HeartMate IP LVAS, which was approved for use in the US by the Food and Drug Administration (FDA) in October 1994. These devices began to gain acceptance in the late 1990s as heart surgeons including Eric Rose, O. H. Frazier and Mehmet Oz began popularizing the concept that patients could live outside the hospital. Media coverage of outpatients with VADs underscored these arguments.

More recent work has concentrated on continuous-flow pumps, which can be roughly categorized as either centrifugal pumps or axial flow impeller driven pumps. These pumps have the advantage of greater simplicity resulting in smaller size and greater reliability. These devices are referred to as second-generation VADs. A side effect is that the user will not have a pulse,
or that the pulse intensity will be seriously reduced.

Third-generation VADs suspend the impeller in the pump using either hydrodynamic or electromagnetic suspension, thus removing the need for bearings and reducing the number of moving parts to one.

Another technology undergoing clinical trials is the use of transcutaneous induction to power and control the device rather than using percutaneous cables. Apart from the obvious cosmetic advantage this reduces the risk of infection and the consequent need to take preventative action. A pulsatile pump using this technology has CE Mark approval and is in clinical trials for US FDA approval.

A very different approach in the early stages of development was the use of an inflatable cuff around the aorta. Inflating the cuff contracts the aorta and deflating the cuff allows the aorta to expand – in effect the aorta becomes a second left ventricle. A proposed refinement is to use the patient's skeletal muscle, driven by a pacemaker, to power this device – which would make it truly self-contained. However a similar operation (cardiomyoplasty) was tried in the 1990s with disappointing results. In any case, it has substantial potential advantages in avoiding the need to operate on the heart itself and in avoiding any contact between blood and the device. This approach involves a return to a pulsatile flow.

At one time Peter Houghton was the longest surviving recipient of a VAD for permanent use. He received an experimental Jarvik 2000 LVAD in June 2000. Since then, he completed a 91-mile charity walk, published two books, lectured widely, hiked in the Swiss Alps and the American West, flew in an ultra-light aircraft, and traveled extensively around the world. He died of acute kidney injury in 2007 at the age of 69.  Since then patient Lidia Pluhar has exceeded Houghton's longevity on a VAD, having received an HeartMate II in March 2011 at age 75, and currently continues to use the device.  In August 2007 The International Consortium of Circulatory Assist Clinicians (ICCAC) was founded by Anthony "Tony" Martin, a nurse practitioner (NP) and clinical manager of the mechanical circulatory support (MCS) program at Newark Beth Israel Medical Center, Newark, N.J. The ICCAC was developed as a 501c3 organization, dedicated to the development of best practices and education related to the care of individuals requiring MCS as a bridge to heart transplantation or as destination therapy in those individuals who don't meet the criteria for heart transplantation.

Studies and outcomes

Recent developments
In August 2007 The International Consortium of Circulatory Assist Clinicians (ICCAC) was founded by Anthony "Tony" Martin. A nurse practitioner (NP) and clinical manager of the mechanical circulatory support (MCS) program at Newark Beth Israel Medical Center, Newark, N.J.. 
In July 2009 in England, surgeons removed a donor heart that had been implanted in a toddler next to her native heart, after her native heart had recovered. This technique suggests mechanical assist device, such as an LVAD, can take some or all the work away from the native heart and allow it time to heal.
 In July 2009, 18-month follow-up results from the HeartMate II Clinical Trial concluded that continuous-flow LVAD provides effective hemodynamic support for at least 18 months in patients awaiting transplantation, with improved functional status and quality of life.
 Heidelberg University Hospital reported in July 2009 that the first HeartAssist5, known as the modern version of the DeBakey VAD, was implanted there. The HeartAssist5 weighs 92 grams, is made of titanium and plastic, and serves to pump blood from the left ventricle into the aorta.
 A phase 1 clinical trial is underway (as of August 2009), consisting of patients with coronary artery bypass grafting and patients in end-stage heart failure who have a left ventricular assist device. The trial involves testing a patch called Anginera which contains cells that secrete hormone-like growth factors stimulating other cells to grow. The patches are seeded with heart muscle cells and then implanted onto the heart with the goal of getting the muscle cells to start communicating with native tissues in a way that allows for regular contractions.
 In September 2009, a New Zealand news outlet, Stuff, reported that in another 18 months to two years, a new wireless device will be ready for clinical trial that will power VADs without direct contact. If successful, this may reduce the chance of infection as a result of the power cable through the skin.
 The National Institutes of Health (NIH) awarded a $2.8 million grant to develop a "pulse-less" total artificial heart using two VADs by Micromed, initially created by Michael DeBakey and George Noon. The grant was renewed for a second year of research in August 2009. The total artificial heart was created using two HeartAssist5 VADs, whereby one VAD pumps blood throughout the body and the other circulates blood to and from the lungs.
 HeartWare International announced in August 2009 that it had surpassed 50 implants of their HeartWare Ventricular Assist System in their ADVANCE Clinical Trial, an FDA-approved IDE study. The study is to assess the system as bridge-to-transplantation for patients with end-stage heart failure. The study, Evaluation of the HeartWare LVAD System for the Treatment of Advanced Heart Failure, is a multi-center study that started in May 2009.
 On 27 June 2014 Hannover Medical School in Hannover, Germany performed the first human implant of HeartMate III under the direction of professor Axel Haverich M.D., chief of the Cardiothoracic, Transplantation and Vascular Surgery Department and surgeon Jan Schmitto, M.D., PhD
 On 21 January 2015 a study was published in Journal of American College of Cardiology suggesting that long-term use of LVAD may induce heart regeneration. This may explain the bridge to recovery phenomenon first described by the Yacoub group in NEJM in 2009 (above).
 Hall-of-Fame Baseball Player Rod Carew had congestive heart failure and was fitted with a HeartMate II. He struggled with wearing the equipment, so he joined efforts to help supply the most helpful wear to assist the HeartMate II and HeartMate III.
 In December 2018, two clinical cases were performed in Kazakhstan and a fully wireless LVAD system of Jarvik 2000 combine with Leviticus Cardio FiVAD (Fully Implantable Ventricular Assist Device) were implanted in humans. The Wireless power transfer technology based on technique called Coplanar Energy Transfer (CET) which is capable of transferring energy from an external transmitting coil to a small receiving coil that is implanted in the human body. In the early postoperative phase, CET operation was accomplished as expected in both patients, which powered the pump and maintained the battery charged to allow medical and nursing procedures. The Leviticus Cardio FiVAD System with wireless, coplanar energy transfer technology which ameliorates infection risk by driveline elimination while providing successful energy transmission allowing for a substantial (approximately 6 hours) unholstered support of the LVAD.
On June 3, 2021, Medtronic issued an urgent medical device notice stating that their HVAD devices should no longer be implanted due to higher rates of neurological events and mortality with the HVAD vs. other available devices 
The majority of VADs on the market today are somewhat bulky. This has proven particularly important for women and children, for whom alternatives would have been too large. As of 2017, HeartMate III has been approved by the FDA. It is smaller than its predecessor HeartMate II, and uses a full maglev impeller instead of the cup-and-ball bearing system found in HeartMate II.

One device, VentrAssist, gained CE Mark approval for use in the EU and began clinical trials in the US. As of June 2007 these pumps had been implanted in over 100 patients. In 2009, Ventracor was placed into the hands of Administrators due to financial problems and was later that year liquidated. No other companies purchased the technology, so as a result the VentrAssist device was essentially defunct. Around 30–50 patients worldwide remain supported on VentrAssist devices as of January 2010.

The HeartWare HVAD works similarly to the VentrAssist—albeit much smaller and not requiring an abdominal pocket to be implanted into. The device has obtained CE Mark in Europe, and FDA approval in the U.S.  The HeartWare HVAD could be implanted through limited access without sternotomy, however in 2021 Medtronic discontinued the device.

In a small number of cases left ventricular assist devices, combined with drug therapy, have enabled the heart to recover sufficiently for the device to be able to be removed (explanted).

HeartMate II LVAD pivotal study
A series of studies involving the use of the HeartMate II LVAD have proven useful in establishing the viability and risks of using LVADs for bridge-to-transplantation and destination therapy.
 The pilot trial for the HeartMate II LVAD began in November 2003 and consisted of 46 study patients at 15 centers. Results included 11 patients supported for more than one year and three patients supported for more than two years.
 The HeartMate II pivotal trial began in 2005 and included the evaluation of HeartMate II for two indications: Bridge to transplantation (BTT) and destination therapy (DT), or long-term, permanent support. Thoratec Corp. announced that this was the first time the FDA had approved a clinical trial to include both indications in one protocol.
 A multicenter study in the United States from 2005 to 2007 with 113 patients (of which 100 reported principal outcomes) showed that significant improvements in function were prevalent after three months, and a survival rate of 68% after twelve months.
 Based on one-year follow up data from the first 194 patients enrolled in the trial, the FDA approved HeartMate II for bridge-to-transplantation. The trial provided clinical evidence of improved survival rates and quality of life for a broad range of patients.
 Eighteen-month follow up data on 281 patients who had either reached the study end-point or completed 18 months of post-operative follow-up showed improved survival, less frequent adverse events and greater reliability with continuous flow LVADS compared to pulsatile flow devices. Of the 281 patients, 157 patients had undergone transplant, 58 patients were continuing with LVADs in their body and seven patients had the LVAD removed because their heart recovered; the remaining 56 had died. The results showed that the patients' NYHA Class of heart failure had significantly improved after six months of LVAD support compared to the pre-LVAD baseline. Although this trial involved bridge-to-transplant indication, the results provide early evidence that continuous flow LVADs have advantages in terms of durability and reliability for patients receiving mechanical support for destination therapy.
 Following the FDA approval of HeartMate II LVAD for bridge-to-transplantation purposes, a post-approval ("registry") study was undertaken to assess the efficacy of the device in a commercial setting. The study found that the device improved outcomes, both compared to other LVAD treatments and baseline patients. Specifically, HeartMate II patients showed lower creatinine levels, 30-day survival rates were considerably higher at 96%, and 93% reached successful outcomes (transplant, cardiac recovery, or long-term LVAD).

HARPS
The Harefield Recovery Protocol Study (HARPS) is a clinical trial to evaluate whether advanced heart failure patients requiring VAD support can recover sufficient myocardial function to allow device removal (known as explantation). HARPS combines an LVAD (the HeartMate XVE) with conventional oral heart failure medications, followed by the novel β2 agonist clenbuterol. This opens the possibility that some advanced heart failure patients may forgo heart transplantation.

To date, 73% (11 of 15) of patients who underwent the combination therapy regimen demonstrated sufficient recovery to allow explantation and avoid heart transplantation; freedom from recurrent heart failure in surviving patients was 100% and 89% at one and four years after explantation, respectively; average ejection fraction was 64% at 59 months after explantation; all patients were NYHA Class I and no significant adverse effects were reported with clenbuterol therapy.

REMATCH
The REMATCH (Randomized Evaluation of Mechanical Assistance for the Treatment of Congestive Heart Failure) clinical trial began in May 1998 and ran through July 2001 in 20 cardiac transplant centers around the USA. The trial was designed to compare long-term implantation of left ventricular assist devices with optimal medical management for patients with end-stage heart failure who require, but do not qualify to receive cardiac transplantation. As a result of the clinical outcomes, the device received FDA approval for both indications, in 2001 and 2003, respectively.

The trial demonstrated an 81% improvement in two-year survival among patients receiving HeartMate XVE compared to optimal medical management. In addition, a destination therapy study following the REMATCH trial demonstrated an additional 17% improvement (61% vs. 52%) in one-year survival of patients that were implanted with a VAD (HeartMate XVE), with an implication for the appropriate selection of candidates and timing of VAD implantation.

A test carried out in 2001 by Dr. Eric A. Rose and REMATCH study group with patients with congestive heart failure that were ineligible for a transplant showed a survival at two years of 23% for those implanted with an LVAD compared with 8% for those who were treated with drugs. The two major complications of VAD implantation were infection and mechanical failure 

According to a retrospective cohort study comparing patients treated with a left ventricular assist device versus inotrope therapy while awaiting heart transplantation, the group treated with LVAD had improved clinical and metabolic function at the time of transplant with better blood pressure, sodium, blood urea nitrogen, and creatinine. After transplant, 57.7% of the inotrope group had kidney failure versus 16.6% in the LVAD group; 31.6% of the inotrope group had right heart failure versus 5.6% in the LVAD group; and event-free survival was 15.8% in the inotrope group versus 55.6% in the LVAD group.

Complications and side effects
Bleeding is the most common postoperative early complication after implantation or explantation of LVADs, necessitating reoperation in up to 60% of recipients. The implications of massive blood transfusions are great and include infection, pulmonary insufficiency, increased costs, right heart failure, allosensitization, and viral transmission, some of which can prove fatal or preclude transplantation. When bleeding occurs, it impacts the one year Kaplan-Meier mortality. In addition to complexity of the patient population and the complexity of these procedures contributing to bleeding, the devices themselves may contribute to the severe coagulopathy that can ensue when these devices are implanted.

Because the devices generally result in blood flowing over a non-biologic surface, predisposing the blood to clotting, there is need for anticoagulation measures. One device, the HeartMate XVE, is designed with a biologic surface derived from fibrin and does not require long term anticoagulation (except aspirin); unfortunately, this biologic surface may also predispose the patient to infection through selective reduction of certain types of leukocytes.

New VAD designs which are now approved for use in the European Community and are undergoing trials for FDA approval have all but eliminated mechanical failure.

It is difficult to measure blood pressure in LVAD patients using standard blood pressure monitoring and the current practice is to measure by Doppler ultrasonography in outpatients and invasive arterial blood pressure monitoring in inpatients.

VAD-related infection can be caused by a large number of different organisms:
 Gram positive bacteria (Staphylococci, especially Staph. aureus, Enterococci)
 Gram negative bacteria (Pseudomonas aeruginosa, Enterobacter species, Klebsiella species)
 Fungi, especially Candida species

Treatment of VAD-related infection is exceedingly difficult and many patients die of infection despite optimal treatment. Initial treatment should be with broad spectrum antibiotics, but every effort must be made to obtain appropriate samples for culture. A final decision regarding antibiotic therapy must be based on the results of microbiogical cultures.

Other problems include immunosuppression, clotting with resultant stroke, and bleeding secondary to anticoagulation. Some of the polyurethane components used in the devices cause the deletion of a subset of immune cells when blood comes in contact with them. This predisposes the patient to fungal and some viral infections necessitating appropriate prophylactic therapy.

Considering the multitude of risks and lifestyle modifications associated with ventricular assist device implants, it is important for prospective patients to be informed prior to decision making. In addition to physician consult, various Internet-based patient directed resources are available to assist in patient education.

List of implantable VAD devices 

This is a partial list and may never be complete
Referenced additions are welcome

See also
 Intra-aortic balloon pump

References

External links
 MyLVAD.com—Non-branded site with information on various LVADs

Implants (medicine)
Cardiology
Prosthetics
Interventional cardiology
Medical devices